Gabriel Özkan (born May 23, 1986 in Stockholm) is a Swedish-Assyrian football player who last played for IF Brommapojkarna. Gabriel joined AIK in the summer of 2006 from Brommapojkarna, after coming through the youth academy before becoming a first-team player, despite still being a teenager.

Biography
On November 14, 2006, he made his debut for the Swedish Under-21 football team against France. He struggled with injuries which cast doubt on his future in the game. He was regarded as one of the best prospects in Swedish football, but he wasn't able to play regularly during his last few seasons following a series of hamstring injuries. His Brazilian teammates nicknamed him as "the new Kaka".

Honours

AIK 
 Allsvenskan: 2009
 Svenska Cupen: 2009
 Svenska Supercupen: 2010

References

External links 
 

1986 births
Living people
Assyrian footballers
Swedish footballers
Sweden under-21 international footballers
Sweden youth international footballers
Swedish people of Assyrian/Syriac descent
IF Brommapojkarna players
AIK Fotboll players
Allsvenskan players
Association football midfielders
Footballers from Stockholm